LG6 or variation, may refer to:

 General Motors LG6, a General Motors 60° V6 engine
 Lagonda LG6, a British car
 Lower Group 6, of the Bushveld Igneous Complex
 Zhonghe metro station (station code LG06) on the Circular line and Wanda–Zhonghe–Shulin line in New Taipei, Taiwan
 Daugavpils Municipality (LG06), Latvia; see List of FIPS region codes (J–L)

See also

 Chromatica (#LG6), Lady Gaga's 6th studio album
 LG (disambiguation)